Lucy Jane Allan (born 30 September 1978) is an English television producer, known for her work on the Channel 4 soap opera Hollyoaks. Allan's other credited work include a script editor for Dream Team and assistant to director in Chica de Río.

Hollyoaks
In 2008, Allan began working with Bryan Kirkwood as the deputy producer for Hollyoaks. She was the assistant producer and producer for Hollyoaks''' spin-offs Hollyoaks: No Going Back and the first series of Hollyoaks Later. Allan took over from Kirkwood as the executive producer of Hollyoaks in January 2009. Her first credited appearance as producer was on 1 June 2009. Allan was responsible for introducing characters including Loretta Jones, Cheryl Brady, Charlotte Lau and Dave Colburn and brought back characters including Jake Dean. It was announced in January 2010 that Allan had decided to step down from her position and would be replaced by Paul Marquess. In November 2020, it was announced that Allan would be reprising her role as executive producer of Hollyoaks'', as well as becoming the head of continuing drama at Lime Pictures. Her episodes began airing from 2 August 2021.

References

External links
 

Living people
1978 births
English television producers
British women television producers
Television people from Liverpool
Soap opera producers